Psidopala shirakii is a moth in the family Drepanidae. It was described by Shōnen Matsumura in 1931. It is found in Taiwan.

References

Moths described in 1931
Thyatirinae
Moths of Taiwan